Wąsowa is a river of Poland. It flows out of the lake Wąsosze and is a left tributary of the River Drawa in Złocieniec. The name Wąsowa was officially changed over replacing the former German name of "Vansow-Fluss" in 1949.

References

Rivers of Poland